Jonathan Cowan is the President and a co-founder of Third Way, a self-described centrist think tank.

Early life and education
Jonathan Cowan (also known as Jon Cowan) was born in Cleveland, Ohio on May 9, 1965. Cowan was raised in Los Angeles for the majority of his childhood. He graduated from Dartmouth College in 1987 with a degree in English.

Career
From 1989 to 1992, Cowan was Press Secretary and Legislative Assistant to Congressman Mel Levine (D-CA). Cowan then focused on political advocacy because he believed no one was acting as an "activist social-change agent in [his] generation." With the bipartisan help of former U.S. senators Paul Tsongas (D-MA) and Warren Rudman (R-NH), Cowan co-founded, with Rob Nelson, the organization Lead...or Leave in 1992. The organization, with no paying members, was primarily funded by American businessman Pete Peterson. In 1994, Cowan and Nelson co-authored the book Revolution X: A Survival Guide for Our Generation. 

During the second Clinton administration, Cowan served as Chief of Staff of the United States Department of Housing and Urban Development. During that presidency, Cowan also served as Senior Advisor to Secretary Andrew M. Cuomo and as Acting Assistant Secretary for Public Affairs under Secretary Henry Cisneros.  

In 2000, Cowan became President of a new organization, Americans for Gun Safety. In 2005, Americans for Gun Safety was folded into the new, multi-issue think tank Third Way, which Cowan co-founded along with Matt Bennett, Jim Kessler, and Nancy Hale.

References

External links

Dartmouth College alumni
Living people
1965 births